Deuchars is a surname. Notable people with the surname include:

 Louis Deuchars (1870–1927), Scottish artist and sculptor
 Marion Deuchars (born 1964), British illustrator and author

See also
 Deuchar (surname)